USS LSM-471 was a  in the United States Navy during World War II. The ship was transferred to France and renamed L9052, later transferred to Republic of China as ROCS Mei Ping (LSM-353).

Construction and career 
LSM-471 was laid down on 27 January 1945 at Brown Shipbuilding Co., Houston, Texas. Launched on 17 February 1945 and commissioned on 23 March 1945.

During World War II, LSM-471 was assigned to the Asiatic-Pacific theater. She was assigned to occupation service in the Far East from 28 September to 4 November 1945.

LSM-471 was decommissioned on 13 May 1946 in Astoria, Oregon.

She was struck from the Navy Register.

The ship was transferred to the France on 7 May 1954 and renamed L9052. She was put into service on 14 August 1954 until 1954, in which was returned to US custody on 15 November 1956, to be transferred to the Republic of China Navy in the same month.

Taiwan refitted the ship with a new bridge between 1969 and 1973 and redesignated LSM-659 between 1978 and 1979.

The ship was renamed ROCS Mei Ping (LSM-353) and served from November 1956 until June 2005.

Awards 
LST-471 have earned the following awards:

American Campaign Medal
Asiatic-Pacific Campaign Medal 
Navy Occupation Service Medal (with Asia clasp)
World War II Victory Medal
Philippine Liberation Medal

Citations

Sources 
 
 
 
 

World War II amphibious warfare vessels of the United States
Ships built in Houston
1945 ships
LSM-1-class landing ships medium
Ships transferred from the United States Navy to the Republic of China Navy
Ships transferred from the United States Navy to the French Navy